A Tree Grows in Brooklyn is a 1945 American drama film that marked the debut of Elia Kazan as a dramatic film director. Adapted by Tess Slesinger and Frank Davis from the 1943 novel by Betty Smith, the film focuses on an impoverished but aspirational, second-generation Irish-American family living in the Williamsburg neighborhood of Brooklyn, New York, in the early 20th century. Peggy Ann Garner received the Academy Juvenile Award for her performance as Francie Nolan, the adolescent girl at the center of the coming-of-age story. Other stars are Dorothy McGuire, Joan Blondell, Lloyd Nolan, Ted Donaldson, and James Dunn, who received the Academy Award for Best Supporting Actor for his portrayal of Francie's father.

The screenplay was adapted for radio in 1949, for a musical play in 1951, and for a television film in 1974. In 2010, A Tree Grows in Brooklyn was selected for preservation in the United States National Film Registry by the Library of Congress as being "culturally, historically, or aesthetically significant".

Plot

The film depicts several months in the life of the Nolans, an Irish American family living in the Williamsburg neighborhood of Brooklyn in 1912. The film covers a much shorter timespan than the book, which ranges from before Francie is born until after she turns 16. The film focuses on the time when Francie is around 13 years old.

Katie Nolan is a hard-working housewife who scrubs the floors of her tenement building and collects rags for sale to a scrap fabric dealer in order to provide for her family. She's married to Johnny Nolan, a happy-go-lucky, charming man who means well, but dreams his way through life, rather than find steady employment. He is also an alcoholic. On the rare occasions he finds work as a singing waiter, everything he earns usually ends up in his drinking, much to Katie's despair. The couple have two children: 13-year-old Francie, who idolizes her father; and 12-year-old Neeley. Tense and frustrated, Katie is often sharper with the children than she means to be, while Johnny is gentle, generous, and indulgent, especially with Francie.

Katie's sister, Sissy, is a sassy, free-spirited woman who has recently married for the third time. Katie learns this from gossipy insurance agent Mr. Barker when he comes by to collect the Nolans' weekly premium. Scandalized and embarrassed, Katie cuts off her relationship with Sissy, which makes the children, who love their unconventional aunt, unhappy. Francie is also worried that the building's landlord has cut too many branches off the tree in the tenement's courtyard, which Francie and her father call the Tree of Heaven, and that it may die. But when she points this out to Johnny, he explains the cutting back is necessary and the tree will grow again.

In the meantime, a police officer new to the neighborhood, Officer McShane, encounters Sissy and the children one afternoon. When he meets Katie, he is enchanted. A few days later, however, he learns Johnny (drunk after an argument with his wife) is Katie's husband, and is devastated to realize Katie is married.

The children's grandmother Rommely often tells them about her immigration to the United States, and how important education is in life. While Neeley isn't interested in books and school, Francie is a bright child who is always reading, thinking about what she reads and observes, and eager to learn. One Sunday, Francie persuades her father to go for a walk and shows him a nicer school in a nearby neighborhood which she'd like to attend. She helps her father write a letter to the principal requesting a transfer, and is accepted.

Meanwhile, Katie moves the family into a smaller, cheaper apartment on the top floor, angering her husband who thinks she is being stingy. In fact, Katie is pregnant and worried how they will support another child. Sissy also becomes pregnant, and she and Katie reconcile shortly before Christmas. The families celebrate a happy, poignant Christmas together, with the children bringing home a discarded tree, and later that night, Katie tells Johnny she is pregnant. She suggests that Francie drop out of school to work. Since Johnny understands how much being in school means to his daughter, he feels desperate to find a job. Despite the fact that it's snowing hard, Johnny goes out determined to find work but fails to return.

A week later, Officer McShane comes to the apartment to deliver the bad news that Johnny died of pneumonia while looking for work. Francie blames her mother for her father's death, but the births of Sissy's and Katie's babies help ease tensions in the household. To provide financial help, a sympathetic tavern owner, Mr. McGarrity, gives Francie and Neeley after-school jobs.

During Katie's labor, at home because they cannot afford the hospital birth Sissy had, Francie is her mother's greatest help and comfort. Katie asks Francie to read some of her creative writing essays, and confides how much she misses Johnny. The shared experience brings mother and daughter closer. When the baby is born, a little girl, Katie names her Annie Laurie, after the song Johnny once sang to them.

The following June, both children graduate from their respective schools on the same day. Katie attends Neeley's graduation, while Sissy goes to Francie's. Using money Johnny gave her for safekeeping back in December, Sissy gives Francie a bouquet of flowers from her father, along with a congratulatory card that Johnny wrote himself. Francie, who has bottled up her grief for many months, finally breaks down.

After the graduation ceremonies, the family reunites at the ice cream shop to celebrate. While there, some boys who know Neeley come by their table. One teenager in particular is very interested in Francie, and asks her to a movie the next day, her first date.

When the Nolans return home, they find Officer McShane babysitting Annie Laurie together with Sissy's husband and his baby. McShane has been waiting to propose to Katie, who accepts. McShane also asks to adopt Annie Laurie and give her his last name. Francie and Neeley think Annie Laurie's life with McShane as a father will be much easier, but not nearly as much fun.

The film ends as Francie sees the courtyard tree begin to grow again, just as her father said it would.

Cast
 Dorothy McGuire as Katie Nolan
 Joan Blondell as Aunt Sissy
 James Dunn as Johnny Nolan
 Lloyd Nolan as Officer McShane
 James Gleason as McGarrity
 Ted Donaldson as Neeley Nolan
 Peggy Ann Garner as Francie Nolan
 Ruth Nelson as Miss McDonough
 John Alexander as Steve Edwards
 B.S. Pully as Christmas tree vendor
 Ferike Boros as Grandma Rommely (uncredited)
 Charles Halton as Mr. Barker, insurance agent (uncredited)

Production

Development
The film rights to Betty Smith's novel A Tree Grows in Brooklyn were the focus of a studio bidding war even before the book's publication in 1943. 20th Century Fox acquired the rights for $55,000. The screenplay was written by Tess Slesinger and Frank Davis, a married couple who often worked together. The film marked the Hollywood drama film debut of Elia Kazan, who had previously achieved renown as a stage director. It was also the first Hollywood film for Nicholas Ray, who was credited as a dialogue coach.

The Production Code Administration initially refused to grant approval to the screenplay due to "the bigamous characterization of Sissy", who appears to be remarrying men even before her previous husbands have died. The screenplay was finally approved in May 1944, although Production Code officials issued "further warnings that Sissy's 'false philosophy' regarding the nature of love and marriage should be toned down". The studio did soften Sissy's characterization due to a libel suit filed by Smith's cousin, Sadie Grandner, who claimed that the character had been based on her and that she had suffered "scorn and ridicule" as a result. 20th Century Fox settled out of court with Grandner for the sum of $1,500.

Casting

20th Century Fox originally intended to cast Alice Faye in the lead role as Katie Nolan. As she was unavailable, Gene Tierney was called for a screen test. Ultimately, Dorothy McGuire, who was only 16 years older than the actress who played her daughter Francie, was cast in the role. The studio originally considered casting an older actress in the role of Francie, since the part was so demanding, but director Elia Kazan insisted on a child performer and Peggy Ann Garner was signed.

A months-long talent search was launched for the part of Johnny Nolan. Phil Regan was considered for the role, but several months later James Dunn was signed. According to The Hollywood Reporter, "Dunn was tested twice, once at the beginning of the search, and again after all other possibilities had been abandoned and it was certain no top box office name would be available". Dunn's critically acclaimed performance turned out to be "a personal triumph" for the actor, who had not appeared in a major studio film for the past five years.

Filming
Production took place between May 1 and August 2, 1944. Filmed on the 20th Century Fox lot, a full stage was taken up with a four-story replica of a tenement house. Described as "the most elaborate and, mechanically speaking, costly set to be used", it included elevators that enabled the camera to pan up and down the flights of stairs in some scenes. The tree of the film's title has been identified as an ailanthus glandulosa. Despite the heat generated by the Klieg lights, the tree survived the filming and was re-planted elsewhere on the studio lot.

20th Century Fox executive Stan Hough later estimated the production budget at $3.6 million.

Release
The film was released in February 1945. It was first viewed by United States troops based in Manila. It had its West Coast premiere in a showing benefiting the Naval Aid Auxiliary.

The film grossed $3 million in box office receipts.

Critical reception
The film was widely praised by critics. Bosley Crowther of The New York Times called it "a vastly affecting film" and praised the "generally excellent cast", singling out Garner, who "with her plain face and lank hair, is Miss Smith's Francie Nolan to the life", and Dunn, who portrays her father with a "deep and sympathetic tenderness". Crowther added: "In the radiant performance by these two actors of a dreamy adoration between father and child is achieved a pictorial demonstration of emotion that is sublimely eloquent". He also praised the "easy naturalness" with which Kazan directs. A Pittsburgh Sun-Telegraph review called Garner's performance "astonishingly superb" and said Dunn's portrayal "has the mark of greatness about it". The Star Tribune acknowledged McGuire for lending "intelligence and depth to a role which, in the hands of a less capable player, might have been shallow and lifeless". This review also complimented the studio for successfully transferring the novel to the screen, managing to trim the novel's scope without distorting the story or message. Variety praised Kazan's direction for handling the potentially tragic story of the overcrowded and poverty-stricken Brooklyn tenements capably and not letting the film become "maudlin". A modern review by Leonard Maltin calls the film "perfect in every detail".

A Tree Grows in Brooklyn was recognized as one of the ten best films of the year by the National Board of Review, Time, and The New York Times, among others.

Accolades
The film won in one acting category, earned an honorary juvenile award, and received a nomination for adapted screenplay at the 18th Academy Awards:

In 2010, the film was selected for preservation in the United States National Film Registry by the Library of Congress as being "culturally, historically, or aesthetically significant".

The film is recognized by American Film Institute in these lists:
 2006: AFI's 100 Years...100 Cheers – Nominated

Adaptations
James Dunn and Connie Marshall starred in a CBS Radio adaptation of A Tree Grows in Brooklyn that aired on April 28, 1949, on Hallmark Playhouse. A musical play of the novel co-written by Betty Smith and George Abbott debuted on April 19, 1951, in New York. Joan Blondell reprised her role as Sissy in the road company version of this play, which opened on October 9, 1952.

The screenplay was adapted for a 1974 NBC television film directed by Joseph Hardy and starring Cliff Robertson, Diane Baker, Pamelyn Ferdin, and James Olson.

Home media
A Tree Grows in Brooklyn was released on Region 1 DVD as part of the 20th Century Fox Home Video box set, The Elia Kazan Collection (2010).

Citations

General sources

External links

 
 
 
 
 

1945 directorial debut films
1945 drama films
1945 films
20th Century Fox films
American black-and-white films
1940s English-language films
Films about alcoholism
Films based on American novels
Films directed by Elia Kazan
Films featuring a Best Supporting Actor Academy Award-winning performance
Films scored by Alfred Newman
Films set in Brooklyn
Films set in New York City
Films set in the 1900s
United States National Film Registry films